Krisp (or Krisp Technologies Inc.) is an AI-based audio processing software company that offers real-time noise and voice suppression technology. The company was founded in 2017 in Yerevan, Armenia, by Davit Baghdasaryan and Artavazd Minasyan, and is based in Berkeley, California, the United States.

Krisp's main product is a software application that can remove background noises and voices from audio in real-time. The software uses machine learning algorithms to analyze the audio signal and separate the speech from background noise, allowing the speech to be output in clear, noise-free audio. This technology has a wide range of applications, including teleconferencing, remote work, podcasting, and video production.

The software can be used as a standalone application, or it can be integrated into existing audio applications such as Skype, Zoom, and Slack. This allows users to enjoy noise-free audio without having to switch between different applications. Additionally, the software can be trained to recognize specific types of noise, such as traffic noise or dog barking, which makes it more effective in suppressing noise in specific environments.

Krisp's noise suppression technology has been praised for its effectiveness and accuracy. It was on the list of Forbes’ America's Most Promising Artificial Intelligence Companies of 2020. Additionally, Krisp was on the TIME List of The 100 Best Inventions of 2020. It has also won two Webby Awards.

In July 2020, Discord added noise suppression into its mobile app using the Krisp audio-filtering technology.

In 2022, Krisp introduced Background Voice Cancellation (BVC).

References 

Software companies established in 2017
Software companies based in the San Francisco Bay Area
Audio software